This is a list of notable British Iraqis, ordered by surname within section.

Academia
 Jim Al-Khalili OBE - professor of theoretical physics at Surrey University and BBC presenter; born in Baghdad to an Iraqi father and English mother
 Alphonse Mingana 
 Hormuzd Rassam

Actors/actresses
 Andy Serkis - actor (Iraqi father of Armenian descent)

Artists
 Lowkey - UK rapper, born Kareem Dennis; his mother is of Iraqi descent

Business
 Nadhmi Auchi
 Samuel Hayek - millionaire real-estate tycoon; chairman of the KKL Charitable Trust
 Nemir Kirdar - Iraqi-born billionaire; President and CEO of Investcorp
 Charles Saatchi - co-founder of the advertising agency Saatchi & Saatchi; born in Baghdad and is of Iraqi Jewish descent; owner of the Saatchi Gallery
 Maurice Saatchi - brother of Charles Saatchi; co-founder of Saatchi & Saatchi; born in Baghdad and is of Iraqi Jewish descent

Film directors
 Kasim Abid - cameraman, director and producer

Politicians

 Anood Al-Samerai - Southwark based councillor for British political party, the Liberal Democrats and leader of Southwark's Liberal Democrat Group (Iraqi father, English mother)
 Sarbaz Barznji - born to Kurdish parents.  Received  “the most successful Kurdish in Britain award” in 2017. Elected as a labour councilor in Brixton Acre Lane. Currently he is a Deputy mayor of London-Lambeth Borough.
 Nadhim Zahawi - born in Baghdad to Kurdish parents; co-founded YouGov with Stephan Shakespeare and was YouGov's CEO from 2005 to 2010; elected as a Conservative councillor in Putney in the London Borough of Wandsworth, and served from 1994 to 2006

Sport
 Youra Eshaya - Assyrian footballer, first Iraqi to play professionally in England

Writers
Tina Brown - journalist, magazine editor, columnist, talk-show host and author of The Diana Chronicles; part Iraqi on her mother's side

See also
British Iraqis
List of Iraqis
List of Iraqi Americans

References

 
Iraqis
British
Iraqis